USTB may refer to:

University of Science and Technology Beijing
University of Science and Technology of Benin
Unión Social de Trabajadores de Bolivia, i.e. Workers Social Union of Bolivia
Ultra Short Term Bonds